The Pennsylvania School for the Deaf is the third-oldest school of its kind in the United States. Its founder, David G. Seixas (1788–1864), was a Philadelphia crockery maker-dealer who became concerned with the plight of impoverished deaf children that he observed on the city's streets. The current school building is listed by the National Register of Historic Places, and two former campuses are similarly recognized.

It is one of four approved chartered schools—along with the Western Pennsylvania School for Blind Children, the Overbrook School for the Blind, the Western Pennsylvania School for the Deaf—in Pennsylvania.

History

In 1819, Seixas began bringing deaf youngsters into his home to provide them with food, clothing and instruction, all at his expense. 
More space became needed to accommodate additional children as Seixas' humanitarian efforts became known, so he rented an office at the southeast corner of Eleventh and High (later Market) Streets to serve as a school. In 1821, prominent Philadelphia citizens decided to help Seixas by incorporating a charitable society: the Pennsylvania Institution for the Deaf and Dumb. The organization was chartered by the Commonwealth of Pennsylvania as "an asylum and school in the city of Philadelphia, where the children of the rich, for a moderate compensation, and of the poor, gratuitously, laboring under the privation of the faculty of speech, are maintained and educated." (Act of the Pennsylvania General Assembly, February 8, 1821) The state also provided financial assistance. Episcopal Bishop William White served as the school's president until his death in 1836.

The number of deaf children needing special education increased so much that a much larger school—more accurately, an asylum—was soon needed. This became the stately Greek Revival structure that still stands at the northwest corner Broad and Pine Streets. Completed in 1826 and later incorporating two additions, this building is an excellent example of major works by three of America's most important 19th-century architects: John Haviland, William Strickland and Frank Furness. When the Pennsylvania School moved to a  campus in Philadelphia's Mount Airy neighborhood in 1892–1893, the Broad and Pine building was purchased by the predecessor of Philadelphia's University of the Arts. The structure, now known as Dorrance Hamilton Hall, is the oldest extant edifice on Broad Street.

Since 1984, the Pennsylvania School for the Deaf has been located in the Germantown section of Philadelphia, occupying several buildings of the Old Germantown Academy site at 100 West School House Lane. Spring Garden College bought the Mt. Airy campus in 1985 and then closed in the early 1990s. The institution presently serves students aged 3 to 18 in preschool through high school classes. As one of four private state-chartered schools, along with the Western Pennsylvania School for the Deaf, which recently took over the Scranton School for Deaf and Hard-of-Hearing Children (formerly known as Scranton State School for the Deaf), the Pennsylvania School is reimbursed for most of its operating expenses by the Commonwealth of Pennsylvania, and eligible youngsters attend tuition-free. The school also depends on charitable contributions. A resource and service center for deaf and hard of hearing adults called the Center for Community and Professional Services also operates on the school's campus.

Under the title Pennsylvania Institute for the Deaf and Dumb, the former campus at 7500 Germantown Avenue was added to the National Register of Historic Places (NRHP) on May 9, 1985. The 1826 Broad Street building is a contributing building in the Broad Street Historic District added to the NRHP in 1984. The current buildings are part of the Old Germantown Academy, added to the NRHP in 1972.

Notable students

Artist Albert Newsam attended the school, starting in 1820.

See also 

 Emma Garrett

References

External links 
 
 Official website of the University of the Arts (Philadelphia)

Historic districts in Philadelphia
School buildings on the National Register of Historic Places in Philadelphia
1890s architecture in the United States
Schools for the deaf in the United States
Germantown, Philadelphia
1820 establishments in Pennsylvania
Educational institutions established in 1820
Historic districts on the National Register of Historic Places in Pennsylvania
John Haviland buildings